Lieutenant-General George Alexander Cozens, KCMG, (1 Aug 1910 – Sept 1986) was an officer in the British Army.

Early life and family
Cozens was educated at Eton, and the Royal Military College, Sandhurst. 
In 1939 Cozens married Helen Barnes in London. They had a son, Keith Alexander Cozens, and a daughter, Brenda Joyce Cozens.

Military career

Before the Second World War
In 1931, Cozens received a commission in the Light Infantry He later passed the Staff College and went on to serve as a staff officer in the Sudan in 1937 and on the British Military Mission to the Egyptian Army.

Second World War
Cozens was still involved in military affairs at the outbreak of the Second World War. In 1941, he was serving under General Sir William Platt in Abyssinia, after which he returned to General Headquarters in Cairo: there he was appointed to Special Operations and later Military Intelligence. During the latter part of the North African campaign, Cozens served as a Brigadier (General Staff) in the 8th Army Group.

In April 1944, Cozens was promoted Lieutenant-General and was later appointed Assistant Chief to General Ronald Scobie.

Postwar service
After the war, Cozens spent the rest of his career with Military Intelligence. He retired from military service in 1954.

Honours
Knight Commander of the Order of St Michael and St George 1 January 1951
Mentioned in dispatches 17 November 1941, 23 May 1946
Officer, Legion of Merit (United States) 4 April 1946
Croix de Guerre (France) 1947/48

1910 births
1986 deaths
People educated at Eton College
British Army personnel of World War II
Knights Commander of the Order of St Michael and St George
Officers of the Legion of Merit
Recipients of the Croix de Guerre 1939–1945 (France)
People from Clapham
Graduates of the Royal Military College, Sandhurst
Military personnel from London
British Army lieutenant generals
Graduates of the Staff College, Camberley